Jocelyn Alizart (born February 1, 1949 in Plaines Wilhems, Mauritius) is a ballet master, teacher and choreographer. He began his career in 1975, under the leadership  of Hanna Voos and the Cuban choreographer Jorge Lefebre.  In 1984, he joined the Malmö Ballet, as ballet master under director Elsa Marianne von Rosen. While there, he created two ballets: Delibes Suite and Samson and Dalila.  He also served briefly with Ballet de France and Ballet du Louvre.

In 1988, he joined the National Ballet of Finland with Director Doris Laine, and then worked between 1991 and 1998 in Deutsche Opera Rhein in Düsseldorf with Heinz Spörli and Yuri Vamos. During this time he created additional ballets, Isadora "Sans limites", Choice of Two Mothers, Twins, En Souvenir, and Pictures.  In 1988, he was asked by Director Uwe Scholz to join the Leipzig Ballet.  Since 2000, he has toured throughout the world, primarily in Northern Europe, as a guest teacher and choreographer.

His body of work includes 12 full-length ballets as well as numerous musicals and solos.

External links 
Alizart
Finnish Dance Database
Leipzig Ballet

Ballet choreographers
Ballet masters
Mauritian dancers
People from Plaines Wilhems District
Living people
1949 births